Monywa  is a Capital City in the Sagaing Division of Myanmar.

References

External links
Maplandia World Gazetteer - map showing the township boundary

Townships of Sagaing Region